is a mountain range in the Chūgoku region of western Japan. The range also reaches under the Pacific Ocean.

Granite is the most common stone found among the mountains, much of which has been exposed through erosion.

Geography

Other than Daisen, most of the mountains run along the border of Tottori and Okayama prefectures and the border of Shimane and Hiroshima prefectures. The mountains form a drainage divide and natural barrier in western Japan between the San'in Region to the north and the San'yō Region to the south.

Major mountains
Mount Daisen（大山）, 
Mount Hyōno（氷ノ山）, 
Mount Mimuro (三室山), 
Mount Osorakan (恐羅漢山), 
Mount Ushiro (後山), 
Mount Kanmuri (冠山), 
Mount Jakuchi (寂地山), 
Mount Ōgi (扇ノ山), 
Mount Dōgo (道後山), 
Mount Hiba (比婆山), 
Mount Nagi (那岐山), 
Mount Hiru (蒜山), 
Mount Sentsū (船通山), 
Mount Myōken (妙見山), 
Mount Sambe (三瓶山), 
Mount Ōsa (大佐山), 
Mount Sen (千ヶ峰), 
Mount Hōbutsu (宝仏山), 
Mount Seppiko (雪彦山), 
Mount Aono (青野山), 
Mount Misumi (三角山), 
Mount Haku (白山),

Rivers

The Chūgoku Mountains are the source of several rivers in western Japan. All flow either north to the Japan Sea or south to the Inland Sea with the exception of the Gōnokawa River, which runs along the mountain range in Hiroshima and Shimane prefectures.

The Sendai River, the Tenjin River, the Hino River, and the Kando River all run steeply from the Chūgoku Mountains to the Japan Sea. The Yoshii River, the Asahi River, and the Ōta River form a broader alluvial plain to the south of the mountain range and empty in to the Inland Sea.

Economy

The Chūgoku Mountains are a source of iron sand, and the region was home to some of the earliest production of ironware in Japan. The broad tablelands of the mountain region support cattle ranches, notably for the production of wagyu beef. The numerous rivers of the Chūgoku Mountains support an extensive network of rice production in western Japan.

References

Mountain ranges of Hyōgo Prefecture
Mountain ranges of Okayama Prefecture
Mountain ranges of Hiroshima Prefecture
Mountain ranges of Shimane Prefecture
Mountain ranges of Tottori Prefecture
Mountain ranges of Yamaguchi Prefecture